Gelechia platydoxa is a moth of the family Gelechiidae. It was described by Edward Meyrick in 1923. It is found in Guyana.

References

Moths described in 1923
Gelechia